Cuvaj is a surname. Notable people with the surname include:

Slavko Cuvaj (1851–1930), Croatian politician 
Bogdan Cuvaj (1905–1983), Croatian football manager